Crosseola errata is a species of minute sea snail or micromollusc, a marine gastropod mollusc in the family Conradiidae.

Description
The height of the shell attains 2 mm, its diameter 1.9 mm.

Distribution
This marine species is endemic off Northland, New Zealand.

References

 Powell A. W. B., New Zealand Mollusca, William Collins Publishers Ltd, Auckland, New Zealand 1979 
 New Zealand Mollusca: Crosseola errata

errata
Gastropods of New Zealand
Gastropods described in 1927
Taxa named by Harold John Finlay